Davontae Harris (born January 21, 1995) is an American football cornerback for the Tennessee Titans of the National Football League (NFL). He attended high school at Wichita South High School in Wichita, Kansas. He played college football at Illinois State.

Professional career

Cincinnati Bengals
Harris was drafted by the Cincinnati Bengals in the fifth round, 151st overall, of the 2018 NFL Draft. He was placed on injured reserve on September 3, 2018 with a knee injury. He was activated off injured reserve on December 5, 2018.

Harris was waived during final roster cuts on August 31, 2019.

Denver Broncos
Harris was signed by the Denver Broncos on September 2, 2019. He played in all 16 games with six starts in 2019, recording 35 tackles and three pass deflections.

Harris entered the 2020 season as the fourth cornerback on the Broncos depth chart. On November 17, 2020, Harris was waived by the Broncos.

Baltimore Ravens
On November 18, 2020, Harris was claimed off waivers by the Baltimore Ravens. After playing in Week 12 against the Pittsburgh Steelers, he started the next week against the Dallas Cowboys, although he only played 15% of the defensive snaps during the game. In Week 14 against the Cleveland Browns, Harris was put in the game following rib and shoulder injuries to Jimmy Smith before an ankle injury of his own late in the fourth quarter took him out. On December 21, 2020, Harris was placed on injured reserve. He was designated to return from injured reserve on January 12, 2021, and began practicing with the team again, but was not activated before the end of the Ravens' postseason. He was waived on January 18, and re-signed with the team on February 8. He was waived again on August 16, 2021.

San Francisco 49ers
On August 17, 2021, Harris was claimed off waivers by the San Francisco 49ers. He was placed on injured reserve on September 1, 2021. He was activated on October 11, then released the next day. He was re-signed to the practice squad on October 14.

Los Angeles Chargers
On November 30, 2021, Harris was signed by the Los Angeles Chargers off the 49ers practice squad.

Chicago Bears
On August 5, 2022, Harris signed with the Chicago Bears. He was released on August 30, 2022 and signed to the practice squad the next day. He was released on November 12.

Tennessee Titans
On November 15, 2022, Harris was signed to the Tennessee Titans practice squad. He was promoted to the active roster on December 17, 2022.

Charity work
Shortly after signing his rookie contract, Harris began giving back to his hometown of Wichita, Kansas. He donated school supplies to the Wichita Children's home and announced he was also taking donations.

References

1995 births
Living people
American football cornerbacks
Baltimore Ravens players
Chicago Bears players
Cincinnati Bengals players
Denver Broncos players
Illinois State Redbirds football players
Los Angeles Chargers players
Players of American football from Wichita, Kansas
San Francisco 49ers players
Tennessee Titans players